Osvaldo Alfredo Gullace Morales (born 1 April 1979) is a Chilean-Argentine former footballer who played as a midfielder.

Career
Born in Santiago, Chile, Gullace moved to Argentina at the age of ten and joined  youth ranks.

Back in Chile, he played for Coquimbo Unido in the Primera División in both 1997 and 1999, with a stint with Santiago Morning in 1998, with whom he got promotion to the top division. He returned to play for them in the 2002 season as well as for Coquimbo Unido in the 2009 season.

After his first step in Chile, he had stints with Pachuca in Mexico and Barcelona B in Spain in 2001. In addition, he had trials with Celtic and Manchester United.

In Argentina, he had an extensive career, with successful stints with Aldosivi, with whom he had promotion to the Primera Nacional in 2004–05, and Huracán Las Heras, with whom he got promotion to the Torneo Argentino B in 2011.

After retiring in 2014 playing for club Leonardo Murialdo from Mendoza, Argentina, he returned to play for Club Atlético Fray Luis Beltrán in 2017 at the age of thirty-eight.

Personal life
Gullace was born in Santiago, Chile, to an Argentine father and a Chilean mother. From his paternal line, he also is of Italian descent since his grandfather was Italian.

References

External links
 
 
 

1979 births
Living people
Footballers from Santiago
Chilean people of Italian descent
Chilean people of Argentine descent
Chilean footballers
Chilean expatriate footballers
Citizens of Argentina through descent
Argentine footballers
Argentine expatriate footballers
Chilean Primera División players
Primera B de Chile players
Coquimbo Unido footballers
Santiago Morning footballers
Liga MX players
C.F. Pachuca players
Segunda División B players
FC Barcelona Atlètic players
Primera Nacional players
Torneo Argentino A players
Torneo Argentino B players
Asociación Atlética Luján de Cuyo players
Aldosivi footballers
Sportivo Desamparados footballers
Club y Biblioteca Ramón Santamarina footballers
Sportivo Patria footballers
Deportivo Maipú players
Torneo Argentino C players
Chilean expatriate sportspeople in Argentina
Chilean expatriate sportspeople in Mexico
Chilean expatriate sportspeople in Spain
Argentine expatriate sportspeople in Mexico
Argentine expatriate sportspeople in Spain
Expatriate footballers in Argentina
Expatriate footballers in Mexico
Expatriate footballers in Spain
Association football midfielders